"Goin' by the Book" is a song written by Chester Lester and originally recorded by Johnny Cash.

Released in the second half of 1990 as a single (Mercury 878 292-7, with "Beans for Breakfast" on the B-side), the song reached number 69 on U.S. Billboard country chart for the week of October 13.

The song is part of Cash's Jack Clement–produced album The Mystery of Life that appeared in 1991.

Background

Track listing

Charts

References

External links 
 "Goin' by the Book" on the Johnny Cash official website

Johnny Cash songs
1990 songs
1990 singles
Songs written by Chester Lester
Song recordings produced by Jack Clement
Mercury Records singles